Abdoul Gafar Kassoum Sina Sirima (born 30 December 1998) is a Burkinabé footballer who plays for Slutsk.

Club career
Sirima made his debut in the Russian Football National League for FC Baltika Kaliningrad on 8 March 2017 in a game against FC Volgar Astrakhan.

On 25 January 2018, Sheriff Tiraspol announced the signing of Sirima.

Career statistics

Club

References

External links
 Profile by Russian Football National League

1998 births
Living people
21st-century Burkinabé people
Burkinabé footballers
Burkinabé expatriate footballers
Expatriate footballers in France
Burkinabé expatriate sportspeople in France
Expatriate footballers in Armenia
Expatriate footballers in Moldova
Burkinabé expatriate sportspeople in Moldova
Expatriate footballers in Russia
Burkinabé expatriate sportspeople in Russia
Expatriate footballers in Belarus
Association football forwards
FC Noah players
FC Sheriff Tiraspol players
FC Baltika Kaliningrad players
FC Tambov players
FC Armavir players
FC Slutsk players